Purwati (born 8 June 1984) is an Indonesian badminton player specializes in doubles. Born in Pekalongan Regency, Purwati had joined the Djarum club in 2000. Together with Meiliana Jauhari, she won the international tournament in 2005 Malaysia Satellite, 2006 Brazil International, and Surabaya Satellite. She also won the mixed doubles title in Brazil partnered with Afiat Yuris Wirawan. Purwati was a women's doubles champion at the World Badminton Grand Prix tournament in Bulgaria Open with Jauhari.

Achievements

IBF Grand Prix 
The World Badminton Grand Prix was sanctioned by the International Badminton Federation from 1983 to 2006.

Women's doubles

IBF International 
Women's doubles

Mixed doubles

References

External links 
 

Living people
1984 births
People from Pekalongan
Sportspeople from Central Java
Indonesian female badminton players
20th-century Indonesian women
21st-century Indonesian women